Shale Jack Niskin (June 18, 1926 – April 1988) was the inventor of the Niskin bottle, a device used for collecting water samples.  He also founded General Oceanics, Inc. in 1966 and served as the company's first president.  General Oceanics, based in North Miami, Florida, manufactures oceanographic and environmental monitoring equipment.

References
 General Oceanics, Inc. website
 Green Gazelles: General Oceanics, Inc.

1926 births
1988 deaths
American chief executives
20th-century American businesspeople
20th-century American engineers
20th-century American inventors